Twease is an open source biomedical web search engine which searches MEDLINE.

It provides searches based on relevance or chronology; highlights text passages that match the query; collects and exports references seamlessly to RefWorks, EndNote, BibTex; searches for articles similar to a group of articles; and offers a slider to control query expansion with common synonyms, word variants, mesh terms, etc. Its content is updated weekly and can be downloaded and set up locally to run unlimited searches against Medline.

External links 
 Twease home page

Medical search engines